Josimar Abdiel Ayarza Tous (born May 3, 1987) is a Panamanian professional basketball player.

Early life 
As a collegiate freshman for Cuesta College, in March 2008, Ayarza was selected for All-Western State Conference First Team accolades after averaging 18.7 points and 8.2 rebounds. Then as a sophomore, he received first-team all-state selection from the CCCAA after averaging 16.6 points, 6.7 rebounds and 2.7 blocks.

Ayarza then signed a letter of intent to play for Southern Mississippi. He scored 410 total points for the Golden Eagles combined from 2009 to 2011.

Professional career 
He played for Atletico Echague Parana of the Liga Nacional de Básquet in Argentina.

International basketball 
He represented the Panama's national basketball team at the 2015 FIBA COCABA Championship in San José, Costa Rica, where he helped secure the gold medal.

References

External links
 Southern Miss Bio
 ESPN profile
 RealGM Profile
 Latinbasket.com profile

1987 births
Living people
Panamanian men's basketball players
Power forwards (basketball)
Southern Miss Golden Eagles basketball players
Associação Bauru Basketball players
Caballeros de Culiacán players
Fuerza Regia de Monterrey players
Estudiantes Concordia basketball players
Lanús basketball players
Jefes de Fuerza Lagunera players
Panamanian expatriate basketball people in Argentina
Panamanian expatriate basketball people in Brazil
Panamanian expatriate basketball people in Colombia
Panamanian expatriate basketball people in Mexico
Panamanian expatriate basketball people in the United States
Panamanian expatriate basketball people in Venezuela
Sportspeople from Panama City